These are the results of the women's doubles competition, one of two events for female competitors in table tennis at the 2004 Summer Olympics in Athens.

Qualifying athletes

Seeds

  (semifinals, bronze medalist) 
  (champion, gold medalist) 
  (final, silver medalist) 
   (fourth round)
  (quarterfinals)
  (fourth round)
  (quarterfinals)
    (quarterfinals)

Final rounds

Preliminary rounds

References

External links
 Official Report of the XXVIII Olympiad, v.2. Digitally published by the LA84 Foundation.
 
 2004 Summer Olympics / Table Tennis / Doubles, Women. Olympedia.

Table tennis at the 2004 Summer Olympics
Olym
Women's events at the 2004 Summer Olympics